Saint Vincent and the Grenadines competed at the 2018 Commonwealth Games in the Gold Coast, Australia from April 4 to April 15, 2018.

Competitors
The following is the list of number of competitors participating at the Games per sport/discipline.

Athletics

Saint Vincent and the Grenadines participated with 6 athletes (5 men and 1 woman).

Men
Track & road events

Field events

Women
Track & road events

Cycling

Saint Vincent and the Grenadines participated with 2 athletes (2 men).

Road
Men

Squash

Saint Vincent and the Grenadines participated with 4 athletes (4 men).

Individual

Doubles

Swimming

Saint Vincent and the Grenadines participated with 4 athletes (4 men).

Men

Table tennis

Saint Vincent and the Grenadines participated with 3 athletes (3 men).

Singles

Doubles

Team

Weightlifting

Saint Vincent and the Grenadines participated with 1 athlete (1 woman).

See also
Saint Vincent and the Grenadines at the 2018 Summer Youth Olympics

References

Nations at the 2018 Commonwealth Games
Saint Vincent and the Grenadines at the Commonwealth Games
2018 in Saint Vincent and the Grenadines